This is a list of Bien de Interés Cultural landmarks in the Province of Lleida, Catalonia, Spain.
 Old Cathedral of Lleida

References 

 
Lleida